Lila Neugebauer (born 1985) is an American theatre director, writer and artistic director. She gained acclaim for her direction of the Broadway revival of Kenneth Lonergan's The Waverly Gallery in 2018. The play earned a Tony Award nomination for Best Revival of a Play. In 2022 she directed her feature film debut, the A24 drama Causeway.

Early life
Neugebauer was born and raised in New York City A native Upper West Sider, she grew up seeing plays and was exposed to theatre, and credits her mother for a lot of that. She attended the Hunter College High School, where she performed in Seven Minutes in Heaven by fellow student Lin-Manuel Miranda. Neugebauer played a partygoer.

Neugebauer was an English major at Yale University. There she befriended actress and playwright Zoe Kazan. She has said that "one of the best classes I took was a constitutional law class".

While in Louisville, she received the 2013 Princess Grace Theater Fellowship Award in partnership with Actors Theatre of Louisville.

Career 
One of the standout young stage directors, her plays include Tracy Letts' Mary Page Marlowe (2018), Edward Albee's At Home at the Zoo (2018), and the world premieres of Sarah DeLappe's The Wolves (2017), The Mad Ones' Mrs. Murray’s Menagerie (2019) and Miles For Mary (2017), Branden Jacobs-Jenkins' Everybody (2017), and Annie Baker's The Antipodes (2017).

Neugebauer continued to direct various plays off-Broadway. She made her Broadway debut as a director for Kenneth Lonergan's revival of The Waverly Gallery which debuted at the John Golden Theatre on September 25, 2018 in previews, and officially opened on October 25. The play, produced by Scott Rudin, is considered a "memory play", and starred Elaine May, Lucas Hedges, Michael Cera, Joan Allen, and David Cromer. The play received widespread critical acclaim, including from Ben Brantley, theatre critic for The New York Times, who described her direction as "fine-tuned." The revival received a Tony Award nomination for Best Play, and a win for Best Actress in a Play (Elaine May).

In 2018, she made her television directing debut for episode of the Duplass brothers’ HBO series Room 104.

In 2019, it was announced that Neugebauer would be teaming up with A24 and Scott Rudin to make her directorial film debut with Red, White and Water, later retitled Causeway. In April 2019, it was announced Jennifer Lawrence was attached as a star in the project, and was written by first-time screenwriter Elizabeth Sanders. The project's principal photography started in mid-June 2019 in New Orleans.

Filmography 
Television

Film
 Causeway (2022)

Theatre

Awards and nominations

References

External links
 

Living people
American theatre directors
Women theatre directors
Broadway theatre directors
People from the Upper West Side
1985 births